Thomas McKee (c. 1770 – 20 October 1814) was a Canadian soldier and political figure.

Biography
McKee was born in the Ohio Country around 1770. He was the son of Alexander McKee (c. 1735–1799), an important official in the British Indian Department, and the grandson of Thomas McKee (c.1695–1769), a veteran of King George's War and the French and Indian War as well as a business associate of George Croghan. His great-grandfather Alexander McKee (d.1740) immigrated to Pennsylvania from County Antrim, Ireland, around 1707, and was a veteran of the Battle of the Boyne. His mother was a Shawnee woman, Nonhelema, who had become a Shawnee chief by 1750.
 
In 1788, the Ojibwa and Ottawa granted him a lease for Pelee Island for 999 years. In 1791, he became a member of the 60th Regiment of Foot of the British Army at Detroit. Three years later, he was part of the Siege of Fort Recovery. eventually reaching the rank of Captain in 1796. In the same year, he became superintendent of Indian affairs for the Northwestern District. In 1797, he also became responsible for the Amherstburg region and he was elected to represent Kent in the 2nd Parliament of Upper Canada. McKee was reelected in 1800 to represent Essex. Around 1806, his duties with the 60th Foot ended, he joined the local militia and served as a Major in the militia during the War of 1812. In 1814, he was accused of grave misconduct, having gotten drunk and allowed his native followers to become drunk and disorderly. During his life, he owned seven or eight slaves.

He died near Île des Cascades in Lower Canada in 1814 while travelling to Montreal.

References 

Biography at the Dictionary of Canadian Biography Online.
Nelson, Larry L. A Man of Distinction among Them: Alexander McKee and the Ohio Country Frontier, 1754–1799. Kent, Ohio: Kent State University Press, 1999. 

1770s births
1814 deaths
British Indian Department
Canadian slave owners
Members of the Legislative Assembly of Upper Canada
Royal American Regiment officers
18th-century Shawnee people
19th-century Shawnee people